Eurilda Q. Loomis France  (1865-1931)  was an American painter.

Biography
France née Loomis was born in 1865 in Pittsburgh. She traveled to Paris, France where she was taught by Jules Joseph Lefebvre and Jean-Joseph Benjamin-Constant. She also studied at the Académie Julian with Carolus-Duran.

She married fellow artist Jesse Leach France on January 24, 1889.

In 1890 France exhibited her painting at the Paris Salon. She  exhibited her work at the Woman's Building at the 1893 World's Columbian Exposition in Chicago, Illinois. She also exhibited her work at the Pennsylvania Academy of the Fine Arts and the National Academy of Design.

France was a member of American Federation of Arts, the Society of Independent Artists, and the New Haven Paint and Clay Club . 

France died in 1931 in New Haven, Connecticut.

References

External links

image of France's art on ArtNet

1865 births
1931 deaths
19th-century American women artists
20th-century American women artists
Artists from Pittsburgh
Society of Independent Artists